Þröstur is am Icelandic language masculine given name. Notable people with the name include:

Þröstur Leó Gunnarsson (born 1961), Icelandic actor
Þröstur Johannesson (born 1955), Icelandic cross-country skier
Þröstur Þórhallsson (born 1969), Icelandic chess grandmaster

Icelandic masculine given names